Lawrence E. "Larry" DeMar (also known as L.E.D.) is a video game and pinball designer and software programmer. He is known as co-designer, alongside Eugene Jarvis, of the classic arcade games Defender and Robotron: 2084.

He is the founder of design firm Leading Edge Design (LED), which creates gaming concepts for the casino industry.

DeMar's games

Video games
Defender
Stargate (a.k.a. Defender II)
Robotron: 2084
Blaster

Pinball

Williams
Black Knight
Jungle Lord
Scorpion
Space Shuttle: Pinball Adventure
High Speed
Banzai Run
FunHouse
Jack*Bot

Midway (Bally)
The Addams Family
The Twilight Zone
World Cup Soccer

External links
Leading Edge Design

Pinball News: Interview with Larry DeMar at Pinball Expo 2003

Living people
Pinball game designers
Video game designers
Video game programmers
Year of birth missing (living people)